Herrskogen is a village in the vicinity of Strömsholm, located in Hallstahammar Municipality in Västmanland County in Sweden. It had 443 inhabitants at the end of 2004, and covers an area of 370,000 square metres.

Populated places in Västmanland County